The 2019 Allied Steel Buildings 200 was a NASCAR Xfinity Series race held on May 4, 2019, at Dover International Speedway in Dover, Delaware. Contested over 200 laps on the 1-mile (1.6 km) concrete speedway, it was the 10th race of the 2019 NASCAR Xfinity Series season. This was the season's fourth and final Dash 4 Cash race.

Background

Track

Dover International Speedway is an oval race track in Dover, Delaware, United States that has held at least two NASCAR races since it opened in 1969. In addition to NASCAR, the track also hosted USAC and the NTT IndyCar Series. The track features one layout, a  concrete oval, with 24° banking in the turns and 9° banking on the straights. The speedway is owned and operated by Dover Motorsports.

Dash 4 Cash
For the final Dash 4 Cash race, Tyler Reddick, Gray Gaulding, Christopher Bell, and Chase Briscoe had qualified for prize eligibility at the previous race.

Entry list

Practice

First practice

Final practice

Qualifying

Qualifying results

. – Eligible for Dash 4 Cash prize money

Race

Summary
Cole Custer started on the pole and dominated the two stages, leading the first 156 laps. Kaz Grala spun after a bump by John Hunter Nemechek with 47 laps to go, causing a caution. Custer lost the race on pit road to Christopher Bell, and was unable to retake the lead due to dirty air. After restarting on the bottom lane, Custer was overtaken by Tyler Reddick and struggled to recover.

Riley Herbst spun and brought out the next caution. On the restart, Bell pulled away while Reddick and Justin Allgaier nearly wrecked battling for second place. The final caution occurred when Gray Gaulding spun out shortly afterwards, also collecting Vinnie Miller. Bell managed to pull away on the restart and held off Allgaier to win the race and Dash 4 Cash prize money.

Stage Results

Stage One
Laps: 60

Stage Two
Laps: 60

Final Stage Results

Stage Three
Laps: 80

. – Won the Dash 4 Cash prize money

References

NASCAR races at Dover Motor Speedway
2019 in sports in Delaware
Allied Steel Buildings 200
2019 NASCAR Xfinity Series